Miyagawa Chōki (birth and death dates unknown) was a Japanese artist active in the early 17th century who specialized in ukiyo-e .

Life and work

No biographical details of Chōki survive.  He was a follower of Miyagawa Chōshun, and considered Chōshun's leading pupil.

Chōki's surviving works come from the Kyōhō (1716–1736) to the Kanpō eras; most are from Kyōhō.  These paintings follow the style of Chōshun in depicting the tastes of the time in fine detail.  The majority are set in the pleasure districts.

See also

References

Works cited

External links
 

17th-century Japanese artists
Ukiyo-e artists